"Two Wrongs Don't Make a Right" is a 1963 song written by Berry Gordy and Smokey Robinson and recorded by Motown star Mary Wells

"two wrongs don't make a right", saying

Music
"Two Wrongs Don't Make a Right", 1973 single by Freda Payne, written by Holland & Dozier
"Two Wrongs Don't Make A Right", song by Wanda Jackson, B-side of single "Two Separate Bar Stools" 1969
"Two Wrongs Don't Make a Right", song by Chilly (band) from the album Showbiz 1980
"Two Wrongs Don't Make a Right", song by Switch (band) from Jermaine Jackson production discography 1981
"Two Wrongs Don't Make a Right", song by Jeffrey Osborne from Stay with Me Tonight (album) 1983
"Two Wrongs (Don't Make a Right)", song by Joe Cocker from Unchain My Heart (album) 1987
"Two Wrongs Don't Make a Right (But They Make Me Feel a Whole Lot Better)", song by Suicidal Tendencies from Join the Army 1987
"Two Wrongs Don't Make a Right", song by the Compulsive Gamblers from Gambling Days Are Over 1995
"Two Wrongs (Don't Make A Right)", song by Dutch band Kayak from Close to the Fire 2000 
"Two Wrongs", song by Wyclef Jean

See also
Two Wrongs Make a Right, Cantonese film